Meeropol is a surname. Notable people with the surname include:

Abel Meeropol (1903–1986), American songwriter and poet whose works were published under his pseudonym, Lewis Allan
Ivy Meeropol (born 1968), documentary film director and producer. Daughter of Michael Meeropol and granddaughter of Julius and Ethel Rosenberg
Michael Meeropol (born Michael Rosenberg, 1943), American professor of economics. Older son of Julius and Ethel Rosenberg
Robert Meeropol (born Robert Rosenberg, 1947), American writer. Younger son of Ethel and Julius Rosenberg